26S proteasome complex subunit DSS1 is a protein that in humans is encoded by the SHFM1 gene.

Function 

The product of this gene has been localized within the split hand/split foot malformation locus SHFM1 at chromosome 7. It has been proposed to be a candidate gene for the autosomal dominant form of the heterogeneous limb developmental disorder split hand/split foot malformation type 1. In addition, it has been shown to directly interact with BRCA2. It also may play a role in the completion of the cell cycle.

Interactions 

SHFM1 has been shown to interact with BRCA2.

References

Further reading